The Vietnam men's national 3x3 team is the 3x3 basketball team representing Vietnam in international men's competitions.

The team won the bronze medal in the men's 3x3 tournament at the 2019 Southeast Asian Games held in the Philippines.

Competitions

References

 
Basketball
Men's national 3x3 basketball teams